Water skiing competitions at the 2022 South American Games in Asuncion, Paraguay were held between October 7 and 9, 2022 at the Costanera Padre Bolik, Encarnación

Schedule
The competition schedule is as follows:

Medal summary

Medal table

Medalists

Men

Women

Participation
Seven nations participated in water skiing events of the 2022 South American Games.

References

Water skiing
South American Games
2022